Ozoir-la-Ferrière is a French railway station in Ozoir-la-Ferrière, in the Seine-et-Marne department in the Île-de-France region. It is served by RER E.

Location 
The station is at kilometric point 34.207 of Paris-Est–Mulhouse-Ville railway. Its altitude is 111 m.

History 
The Chemins de fer de l'Est company put into service Ozoir-la-Ferrière station on 9 February 1857, as the section from Nogent–Le Perreux to Nangis opened to commercial service. The section originally opened with a single track, until a second one was put into service on 23 April. The next section, from Nangis to Flamboin, opened on 25 April 1857.

The former Ozoir station was located halfway between Roissy-en-Brie and the current station, on Roissy commune. The new station was inaugurated on 30 September 1984.

In 2000, a contract between the state and the Île-de-France region organized the expansion of the RER E from Villiers-sur-Marne to Tournan. On 14 February 2002, the STIF board of directors approved the pilot program. On 14 December 2003, the line was cut from its historical network to Paris-Est, and linked with RER E leading to Haussmann–Saint Lazare underground station. The integration modified journeys and timetables, and improved services at the station.

Platforms were raised from 0.55 meters (1.80 ft) to 0.92 meters (3.02 ft), to facilitate access to the carriages. Facilities improved accessibility to people with limited mobility. Screens on the platforms show real time information.

According to SNCF figures, in 2014, 2,143,800 passengers entered Ozoir station.

Service

Facilities 
The station has three exits and is accessible to disabled people. Facilities include an elevator, two automatic ticket dispensers and two help booths. It is equipped with the Infogare information display system.

Train service 
Ozoir-la-Ferrière is served by RER E trains running on E4 branch, between Haussmann–Saint Lazare and Tournan. It is served by one train every 30 minutes in both directions (every 15 minutes during peak hours).

Connections 
Car parks are set near the station. It is served by :
 Arlequin bus lines 5 and 14
 Stigo bus lines 11 and 201
 Pep's bus line 13
 Seine-et-Marne Express bus line 16
 Sit'bus line A
 OLFI communal electric shuttle
 Noctilien night bus line N142

See also 
 List of stations of the Paris RER
 Paris-Est–Mulhouse-Ville railway
 RER E

References

External links 
 

Réseau Express Régional stations
Railway stations in Seine-et-Marne
Railway stations in France opened in 1857